The 1999 Islands District Council election was held on 28 November 1999 to elect all 7 elected members to the 19-member District Council.

Overall election results
Before election:

Change in composition:

References

External links
 Election Results - Overall Results

1999 Hong Kong local elections